John James "Jack" O'Hara (24 September 1866 – 28 August 1931) was an  Australian rules footballer who played with South Melbourne in the Victorian Football League (VFL).

Notes

External links 

1866 births
1931 deaths
Australian rules footballers from Melbourne
Sydney Swans players
People from South Melbourne